Human Accomplishment: The Pursuit of Excellence in the Arts and Sciences, 800 B.C. to 1950 is a 2003 book by the political scientist Charles Murray. Surveying outstanding contributions to the arts and sciences from ancient times to the mid-twentieth century, Murray attempts to quantify and explain human accomplishment worldwide in the fields of arts and sciences by calculating the amount of space allocated to them in reference works, an area of research sometimes referred to as historiometry.

Index scores
Murray ranks the leading 4,000 innovators in several fields of human accomplishment from 800 BC to 1950. In each field Murray identifies a number of sources (leading encyclopedias, histories and surveys) providing information about the leading figures in the field. The rankings are made from information in these sources. A raw score is determined based on how many sources mention and on how much space in each source is devoted to a person. Then these raw scores are normalized so that the lowest score is 1 and the highest score is 100. The resulting scores are called "Index Scores".

Analysis 
According to Murray's analysis, accomplishment has not been uniformly distributed. For example, in Italian Renaissance, accomplishment was concentrated in Florence and Venice. In the British Isles, around London, the industrial north, and lowland Scotland. Another result of his analysis was that most innovation has been accomplished by men, not women, and Europeans, not other ethnic and cultural groups.

There is a relationship between closeness to elite universities and human accomplishment (but not between non-elite universities and accomplishment). Furthermore, innovation is self-reinforcing: Where there has been innovation, likely more will occur.

The book argued that "Streams of accomplishment are fostered by political regimes that give de facto freedom of action to their potential artists and scholars". This means freedom of expression and innovation. It does not necessarily mean democracy although totalitarianism suppressed innovation. War and civil unrest did not affect innovation.

Religious liberty increased innovation. Jews had "sparse representation in European arts and sciences through the beginning of the 19C", but within a century Jews were disproportionately represented (except in astronomy). This coincided with the emancipation of Jews who earlier had been denied legal rights and access to universities and public office.

The highest scoring woman in a category was Murasaki Shikibu among Japanese literature. The highest in western literature was Virginia Woolf. The highest in science was Marie Curie.

Decline 
Murray argued that the world's per capita progress in the sciences and especially the arts have declined, usually starting sometimes in the nineteenth century. In part this is due to diminishing returns. In the final chapters he abandons empirical analysis, writing  "I cannot supply quantitative measures", and the analysis is "less quantitative, more speculative, and definitely more opinionated." He argued, based on Aristotle in the Nicomachean Ethics, that innovation is increased by beliefs that life has a purpose and that the function of life is to fulfill that purpose; by beliefs about transcendental goods and a sense of goodness, truth and beauty; and by beliefs that individuals can act efficaciously as individuals, and a culture that enables them to do so. Murray argued that there is an absence of this in the current secularist and nihilist society which has caused the decline.

Reviews 

The American Library Association: "Achievements that require mental and spiritual effort are the highest forms of human endeavor, Murray says. He has scanned the most reputable biographical dictionaries and histories of the arts, philosophy, and sciences to find who and what, during 800 B.C.-1950, are mentioned in them. He came up with 4,139 persons and a list of events and ponders 20 persons in each of nine scientific, three philosophic, and nine artistic fields who were most extensively covered in the resources. More than 80 percent are "dead white males," and Murray carefully examines why. The greatest achievements of India, China, Japan, and Islam occurred well before the West took off during the Renaissance, and each of those cultures valued duty, family, and consensus, whereas the West prefers individualism, the sine qua non of scientific debate and discovery. Further, the scientific method was a set of Western "meta-inventions" (Murray's term) that arose, fortunately, simultaneously with the ratification of Thomism, with its dual emphasis on faith and reason, by the most important cultural force in the West, the Roman Catholic Church. Of overarching importance to great achievements in any culture, Murray argues, are the sense that life has purpose and belief in ideals of beauty, truth, and goodness. This book probably won't get Murray in as much hot water as The Bell Curve (1994) did. Then again, with its speculations that the rate of great achievements has slowed since 1800 and that the arts are in a very bad way, maybe it will."

Socialist Nathan J. Robinson of Current Affairs criticized Murray's methodology, arguing that quantifying "significance" by representation in encyclopedias and biographical dictionaries, and excluding work produced since 1950, led to an overemphasis of Western cultural achievements. He said "Human Accomplishment is one of the most absurd works of 'social science' ever produced."

References

External links
 Cato Institute Book Forum (RealVideo) (RealAudio), 1-hour lecture that Murray gave discussing his book Human Accomplishment, and some of the response to it.
 American Conservative – book review
 Q&A with Charles Murray on Human Accomplishment, Steve Sailer.
 "Of human accomplishment" , Denis Dutton

2003 non-fiction books
American non-fiction books
Books by Charles Murray
English-language books
HarperCollins books